Beggerlay Canyon is a canyon on the Stikine River in northwestern British Columbia, Canada, located northeast of the communities of Iskut, British Columbia and Eddontenajon Lake.

References

Canyons and gorges of British Columbia
Stikine Country